Queen of the Valley Medical Center is a medical center located in Napa, California operated by Providence Health & Services. The hospital first opened its doors in 1958 when it replaced Parks Victory Memorial Hospital. It is a Level III adult trauma center. The medical center is the largest employer in Napa County.

Services
Regional Cancer Center
Regional Heart Center
Trauma, Emergency
Imaging Services
Cancer Center 
Nursing Center of Excellence
Rehabilitation Services
Women's Imaging Center
Maternity & Infant Care 
Workhealth
Regional Orthopedic Center

References

External links 
Main website
This hospital in the CA Healthcare Atlas A project by OSHPD

Hospital buildings completed in 1958
Hospitals in the San Francisco Bay Area
Hospitals in Napa County, California
Hospitals established in 1958
Napa, California
Roman Catholic Diocese of Santa Rosa
1958 establishments in California
Trauma centers